James Oswald Jacoby (April 4, 1933 – February 8, 1991) was an American bridge player and writer. He played as Jim Jacoby but he wrote books as James and for many years co-wrote a syndicated bridge column with his father as "Jacoby on Bridge" by Oswald and James Jacoby.  (He wrote a re-branded newspaper bridge column after his father's death.)

He won 16 "national" (ACBL) championships, first at age 22 in 1955, and he was the most successful ACBL tournament player (s leader) during 1988.

Jacoby may have inherited talent and interest in games not only from his legendary father Oswald Jacoby. He and his mother Mary Zita Jacoby co-wrote The New York Times Book of Backgammon (1973). 

Jacoby graduated from the University of Notre Dame. He was a long-time resident of Texas and an original, 1968 member of the professional bridge team formed by Texas businessman Ira Corn, variously known as the Aces, Dallas Aces, and Texas Aces.

Jacoby was a resident of Richardson, Texas, when he died of cancer in a Dallas hospital at age 58. He was survived by his wife Judy, his son Jim Jacoby, Jr., and his brother Jon.

In  competition Jacoby was a member of four world champions. The Aces won the Bermuda Bowl both in 1970 as U.S. representative and in 1971 as defending champion. United States won the 8th quadrennial World Team Olympiad in 1988 (its first win in the open flight, in a field of 56 national teams). Jacoby also led the winning mixed team in 1972 as playing captain.

At  Jacoby won world silver medals in the 1966 Open Pairs with Dr. John Fisher and in the 1978 Mixed Pairs with Heitie Noland (quadrennial events in non-Olympic even years).

Jacoby was inducted into the ACBL Hall of Fame in 1997.

Bridge accomplishments

Awards and honors

 Barry Crane Trophy, 1988 
 ACBL Hall of Fame, 1997

References

External links
 
 
 
 

1933 births
1991 deaths
Writers from New York City
American contract bridge players
Bermuda Bowl players
Contract bridge writers
University of Notre Dame alumni
People from Richardson, Texas